Vilar is a panchayat town in Thanjavur taluk of the Thanjavur district in Tamil Nadu, India. The town is situated near the village Kandidhampattu.

Industry
The primary industry in Vilar is farming, mostly consisting of small farmers.
Major crops include cashew and groundnut. During the 1967 drought, the people of Vilar were affected to the greatest extent as it was predominantly a dry area. In recent days Vilar has become a very fertile area, thanks to the rise in ground water by motor pumps.

There are also several industries in the area. Chandrakala Seeds is one company which is actively engaged in the development of farmers and seed productivity.

Demographics
As per the 2001 census, Vilar had a total population of 5628 with 2885 males and 2743 females. The sex ratio was 951. The literacy rate was 55.82%.

Memorial
The war memorial Mullivaikal Muttram, spread out on a 1.75-acre plot at Vilar, is built by Tamil nationalist leader Pazha Nedumaran of the World Tamil Confederation Trust and M. Natarajan, editor of Tamil Arasi and Puthiyaparvai.

References
 

Villages in Thanjavur district